"Please Don't Break My Heart" is a song by Greek-American pop singer Kalomira, featuring American rapper Fatman Scoop. It serves as first single from her upcoming studio album and was released as a digital download on 1 May 2010. The song was produced by Toni Cottura.

Promotion
Kalomira premiered the song on the Greek version of Dancing with the Stars. She also performed the song together with Fatman Scoop at the 2010 MAD Video Music Awards.

Music video
The music video was shot in April 2010 in Istanbul, Turkey. It premiered on May 20, 2010 via Kalomira's official YouTube account. In the video, Kalomira sings to a photo of her boyfriend and walks around in a fairy-tale setting in a dress before transitioning into an urban setting in hip-hop clothing with scenes of Fatman Scoop rapping alongside her.

Charts

References

2010 singles
Kalomira songs
Fatman Scoop songs
Songs written by Terri Bjerre
2010 songs
Songs written by Toni Cottura